Major Havoc (or The Adventures of Major Havoc) is an arcade action game released by Atari, Inc. in 1983. A vector-based upright arcade cabinet, Major Havoc consists of several smaller game experiences played in succession, including a fixed shooter, platform game, and a lunar lander sequence. It was developed by Owen Rubin with some levels designed and tuned by Mark Cerny, who joined the development team approximately a year into the game's development.

The game was released as a dedicated cabinet in 1983 and then one year later as a conversion kit for older vector arcade games like Tempest. Dedicated versions of the game used a roller control for left-right movement, while conversion kits used their native controller hardware, such as the Tempest rotary spinner knob.

Plot
According to the story provided by the game's original cabinet, long ago the evil Vaxxian Empire overran the galaxy. Most of humanity was enslaved and abducted to the Vaxxian homeworld. A few humans, who were scientists, managed to escape.
At the current moment (according to the timeline of the game), the Empire has since collapsed. However, numerous Vaxxian space stations, all blindly controlled and defended by robots, still remain in the galaxy, mindlessly pursuing their original orders.

The small band of scientists who initially escaped managed to clone the great human hero Major Havoc, in order to fly his  Catastrofighter through a wormhole in space, so that he may lead a clone army against the dreaded Vaxxian robots, and to liberate the remnants of humanity by destroying the enemy reactors. The player controls Major Havoc, the leader of this very band of clones.

Some games identified the Vaxxian homeworld as Maynard, referring to the town of Maynard, Massachusetts, home of Digital Equipment Corporation, manufacturer of the VAX minicomputer.

Gameplay

The player controls the titular character, Major Rex Havoc, first in the "shoot-'em-up" style game, in which the player operated Major Havoc's spaceship, the Catastrofighter, against the numerous robot ships who defend the enemy reactors. The ships are encased in a sort of "buckyball" force-field shield which must be shot first before the ship can be killed.

In the next phase, the player lands on the robot space station by centering the Catastrofighter in between the moving white line and Major Havoc would exit his ship and enter the space-station. The roller-knob controlled left and right character movement and a "jump" button permits the player's character to leap over obstacles. The object is to get to the core of the space station, sabotage the reactor, and escape to a  minimum safe distance before the space station explodes. Red arrows point the direction going in and the word "OUT" appears on the arrows during escape to point the direction out. The levels get gradually more complicated and difficult to navigate as the player progresses. Upon a successful mission, the next space station becomes more difficult and the time allotted (both in and out) is decreased.

The game includes a "warp system" that lets the player to skip levels and gain bonus points. Warps are activated by a Breakout game at the bottom-right of the screen, where there are two- or three-digit numbers. The player has to move the joystick until the number matches the number required to warp. For example, the red warp requires the number 23, so the player moves the joystick to the right or left until the first digit matches 2, then the player clicks the fire button, the Breakout ball starts moving, so the player has to play the game while moving the joystick to the 3 at the same time. When the player enters the warp code, the player is transported to a higher level.

Extra lives are earned not only by achieving a certain number of points, but also by completing the Breakout mini-game.

Reception
Gene Lewin of Play Meter magazine reviewed the arcade game in 1983, scoring it 2 out of 10 for initially being an expensive dedicated cabinet rather than a more affordable conversion kit.

Legacy
Major Havoc was re-released as part of compilations of older Atari games, such as Atari Anthology. In July 2010, the game was re-released on Microsoft's Game Room service for its Xbox 360 console and for Games for Windows Live. In March 2011 a port was released on Nintendo DS and iOS as part of the Atari's Greatest Hits Vol. 2 collection.

World record 
According to Twin Galaxies, Ettore Ciaffi, of New York, NY, scored a world record 1,940,078 points on June 28, 1985 at the Broadway Arcade during the 1985 Video Game Masters Tournament.

See also 
Xybots,  later Atari Games title themed after Major Havoc

References

External links

Major Havoc at the Arcade History database
 Atari Museum: Major Havoc
 The Games that Time Forgot: Video demonstration of Major Havoc
 Owen Rubin's (the creator's) home page. See Game Stories Link for more info
 Twin Galaxies High Score Rankings on Major Havoc

1983 video games
Arcade video games
Arcade-only video games
Atari arcade games
Vector arcade video games
Video games developed in the United States